The First Methodist Church in Alexandria, Louisiana was built in 1907.  It was added to the National Register of Historic Places in 1980.

It was deemed notable in part as it is "the city's only monumental example of the Romanesque Revival. Other churches are designed in the Gothic or Classical style. Other buildings have Romanesque features, but these are merely commercial buildings with applied features. Unlike the church they do not have towers, arcades, or the proper Romanesque massing."

It originally served the First Methodist Church of Alexandria;  it had served two other congregations and then the Greater New Hope
Baptist Church by 1980.

References

Churches completed in 1907
20th-century Methodist church buildings in the United States
Buildings and structures in Alexandria, Louisiana
Churches on the National Register of Historic Places in Louisiana
Churches in Rapides Parish, Louisiana
National Register of Historic Places in Rapides Parish, Louisiana